The Pont de l'Alma is a road bridge in Paris, France, across the Seine. It was named to commemorate the Battle of Alma during the Crimean War, in which the Ottoman-Franco-British alliance achieved victory over the Russian army, on 20 September 1854. The bridge is also known for being the site of a car crash that caused the death of Diana, Princess of Wales and Dodi Fayed.

History

Construction
Construction of an arch bridge took place between 1854 and 1856. It was designed by Paul-Martin Gallocher de Lagalisserie and was inaugurated by Napoleon III on 2 April 1856. Each side of both of the two piers was decorated with a statue of military nature: a Zouave and a grenadier by Georges Diébolt, and a skirmisher and an artilleryman by Arnaud.

The Zouave statue and flooding

The general public took the original bridge as a measuring instrument for water levels in times of flooding on the Seine: access to the footpaths by the river embankments usually was closed when the Seine's level reached the feet of The Zouave; when the water hit his thighs, the river was unnavigable. During the great flood of the Seine in 1910, the level reached his shoulders. The French Civil Service used the Pont de la Tournelle, not the Pont de l'Alma, to gauge flood levels, and since 1868 uses the Pont d'Austerlitz.

Reconstruction
The bridge underwent complete reconstruction as a girder bridge between 1970 and 1974, as it had been too narrow to accommodate the increasing traffic both on and below it; moreover, the structure had subsided some 80 centimeters. Only the statue of the Zouave was retained: the Skirmisher was relocated to the Gravelle Stronghold in Vincennes, the Grenadier to Dijon, and the Artilleryman to La Fère.

Death of Diana, Princess of Wales

The bridge is close to the Pont de l'Alma tunnel where Diana, Princess of Wales, and three others were involved in a fatal car crash on 31 August 1997. They were being chased by paparazzi, and their chauffeur was driving under the influence of alcohol. The Flame of Liberty (completed in 1987), at the bridge's north end has become an unofficial memorial to Diana. The square is now officially named Place Diana. The tunnel is known as an accident black spot from 1982 to 1997 
as there were 11 deaths in the area.

Technical specifications
Pont de l'Alma has a length of 153 meters (502 ft) and a width of 42 meters (138 ft).

Access
The Metro station Alma - Marceau is near the north end of the bridge, RER station Pont de l'Alma near the south end.

References

External links

  Pictures of the old and the new bridge
  Bridge history

Bridges over the River Seine in Paris
Bridges completed in 1856
Bridges completed in 1974
Buildings and structures in the 7th arrondissement of Paris
Buildings and structures in the 8th arrondissement of Paris
1856 establishments in France
Diana, Princess of Wales